In Greek mythology, Koalemos (Ancient Greek: Κοάλεμος) was the god of stupidity, mentioned once by Aristophanes, and being found also in Parallel Lives by Plutarch. Coalemus is the Latin spelling of the name. Sometimes he is referred to as a dæmon, more of a spirit and minor deity.

Otherwise, the word κοάλεμος was used in the sense of "stupid person" or also "blockhead".

His etymology is not established, however.

See also 
 Alala
 Alke
 Homados
 Ioke
 Palioxis
 Polemus
 Proioxis

Notes

Resources
 A Greek-English Lexicon compiled by H. G. Liddel and R. Scott. tenth edition with a revised supplement. – Clarendon Press, Oxford, 1996. - p. 966, under κοάλεμος
 Aristophanes, Knights from The Complete Greek Drama, vol. 2. Eugene O'Neill, Jr. New York. Random House. 1938. Online version at the Perseus Digital Library.
Aristophanes, Aristophanes Comoediae edited by F.W. Hall and W.M. Geldart, vol. 1. F.W. Hall and W.M. Geldart. Oxford. Clarendon Press, Oxford. 1907.  Greek text available at the Perseus Digital Library.

Greek gods
Personifications in Greek mythology
Daimons